Situation Hot is actually a re-release of Arabian Prince's earlier singles from the days before N.W.A. It was released on cassette in 1990, then re-packaged as Greatest Hits on CD in 1998 with a slightly expanded track list.

1990 Track Listing
"Strange Life" - 6:52
"It Ain't Tough" - 6:09
"Innovative Life" - 5:55
"Professor X (Saga)" - 4:24
"Situation Hot" - 4:37
"Take You Home, Girl"  - 8:17
"Innovator" - 4:54
"Let's Hit the Beach" - 5:27

1998 Track Listing
"It Ain't Tough" - 6:09
"Innovative Life" - 5:55
"Professor X (Saga)" - 4:24
"Situation Hot" - 4:37
"Panic Zone" (N.W.A) - 3:32
"Strange Life" - 6:52
"Take You Home, Girl"  - 8:17
"Innovator" - 4:54
"Let's Hit the Beach" - 5:27
"Let's Jam" (The Unknown DJ) - 5:37

Personnel
 Rock-A-Fella - Arranger
 Arabian Prince - Executive Producer/Performer
Dr. Dre - Vocals/Performer
 Tracy Kendricks - Co-Producer
 Courtney Branch - Co-Producer
 Mike Miller - Photography
 Lynda Simmons - Stylist
 Henry Marquez - Art Direction

References

Arabian Prince albums
1990 compilation albums
Albums produced by Courtney Branch